Natural High may refer to:

Albums
 Natural High (Bloodstone album) or the title song (see below), 1973
 Natural High (Commodores album), 1978 
 Natural High (Frank Gambale album), 2006
 Natural High (Wataz album), 1998
 Natural High, by Lil Rob, 1999

Songs
 "Natural High" (Bloodstone song), 1973
 "Natural High" (HammerFall song), 2006
 "Natural High" (Merle Haggard song), 1984
 "Natural High", by Colby O'Donis from Colby O, 2008

Other uses
 Natural High (organization), an American substance-abuse prevention organization
 Natural High, a 1970s band signed to Malaco Records

See also 
 High (disambiguation)
 Substance intoxication